The 1933 PGA Championship was the 16th PGA Championship, held August 8–13 at Blue Mound Country Club in Wauwatosa, Wisconsin, a suburb west of Milwaukee. Then a match play championship, Gene Sarazen won the third of his three PGA Championship titles, defeating Willie Goggin 5 & 4. It was the sixth of his seven major titles.

Defending champion Olin Dutra lost in the second round to semifinalist Johnny Farrell, 1 up.

This was Wisconsin's first and only major for 71 years; the PGA Championship returned to the state in 2004 at Whistling Straits near Kohler.

Format
The match play format at the PGA Championship in 1933 called for 12 rounds (216 holes) in six days:
 Tuesday – 36-hole stroke play qualifier
defending champion Olin Dutra and top 31 professionals advanced to match play
 Wednesday – first round – 36 holes 
 Thursday – second round – 36 holes 
 Friday – quarterfinals – 36 holes 
 Saturday – semifinals – 36 holes 
 Sunday – final – 36 holes

Past champions in the field

Final results
Sunday, August 13, 1933

Final eight bracket

Final match scorecards
Morning

Afternoon

Source:

References

External links
PGA Media Guide 2012
PGA.com – 1933 PGA Championship

PGA Championship
Golf in Wisconsin
PGA Championship
PGA Championship
PGA Championship
PGA Championship